Rhys Mathieson (born 10 January 1997) is a professional Australian rules footballer with the Brisbane Lions in the Australian Football League (AFL). At 1.87 metres (6 ft 2 in) tall and weighing 84 kilograms (185 lb), he plays as a Midfielder and is known for his ability to win contested ball.

AFL career
He was recruited by the Brisbane Lions with the 39th selection in the 2015 national draft. He played his first senior game in round 9 of the 2016 season against Melbourne. In his time at the Lions he has been known for his on-field antics, in particular his goal celebrations. Upon kicking his first AFL goal, Rhys celebrated with a 'shotgun' move made famous by Hawthorn's Mark Williams and faced some criticism for this showboating, while the Lions were losing to GWS in round 17, 2016.

Statistics
Updated to the end of the 2022 season.

|-
| 2016 ||  || 36
| 11 || 8 || 3 || 100 || 101 || 201 || 26 || 41 || 0.7 || 0.3 || 9.1 || 9.2 || 18.3 || 2.4 || 3.7 || 0
|-
| 2017 ||  || 36
| 13 || 8 || 1 || 106 || 130 || 236 || 44 || 47 || 0.6 || 0.1 || 8.2 || 10.0 || 18.2 || 3.4 || 3.6 || 0
|-
| 2018 ||  || 36
| 13 || 4 || 2 || 87 || 124 || 211 || 39 || 39 || 0.3 || 0.2 || 6.7 || 9.5 || 16.2 || 3.0 || 3.0 || 0
|-
| 2019 ||  || 36
| 9 || 4 || 3 || 69 || 68 || 137 || 23 || 28 || 0.4 || 0.3 || 7.8 || 7.7 || 15.5 || 2.5 || 3.1 || 0
|-
| 2020 ||  || 36
| 1 || 0 || 0 || 8 || 6 || 14 || 5 || 0 || 0.0 || 0.0 || 8.0 || 6.0 || 14.0 || 5.0 || 0.0 || 0
|-
| 2021 ||  || 36
| 15 || 2 || 2 || 84 || 85 || 169 || 36 || 39 || 0.1 || 0.1 || 5.6 || 5.7 || 11.3 || 2.4 || 2.6 || 0
|-
| 2022 ||  || 36
| 10 || 3 || 4 || 73 || 74 || 147 || 25 || 25 || 0.3 || 0.4 || 7.3 || 7.4 || 14.7 || 2.5 || 2.5 || 2
|- class=sortbottom
! colspan=3 | Career
! 72 !! 29 !! 15 !! 527 !! 588 !! 1115 !! 198 !! 221 !! 0.4 !! 0.2 !! 7.3 !! 8.2 !! 15.5 !! 2.8 !! 3.1 !! 2
|}

Notes

References

External links

1997 births
Living people
Brisbane Lions players
Bell Park Football Club players
Geelong Falcons players
Australian rules footballers from Victoria (Australia)